In the United States, a permanent fund is one of the five governmental fund types established by GAAP. It is classified as a restricted true endowment fund for governments and non-profit organizations. Put simply, a permanent fund may be used to generate and disburse money to those entitled to receive payments by qualification or agreement, as in the case of Alaska citizens or residents that satisfy the rules for payment from their permanent fund from State oil revenues. It was first introduced through GASB Statement 34. The name of the fund comes from the purpose of the fund: a sum of equity used to permanently generate payments to maintain some financial obligation. Also, a fund can only be classified as a permanent fund if the money is used to report the status of a restricted financial resource. The resource is restricted in the sense that only earnings from the resource are used and not the principal. For example, a fund can be classified as a permanent fund if it is being used to pay for accounting services for a perpetual endowment of a government-run cemetery or financial endowments towards a government-run library.

A common misconception is that permanent funds are required for special-purpose government entities that solely engage in business-type activities. However, this is not the case. According to Statement 34, that special-purpose government entity needs only to report the net balance of the restricted resources.

See also 
 The Petroleum Fund of Norway
 Permanent School Fund - funds K–12 schools in Texas, mostly from oil and natural gas revenue.
 Permanent University Fund - funds universities in Texas, mostly from oil and gas revenue.
 The Alaska Permanent Fund provides annual dividends to residents of the State of Alaska
Public company
Government Accountability Office investigations of the Department of Defense
Federal Accountability Act (Canada)

External links
GAO History Government Accounting Office
PDF - Capital Asset Accounting System (Permission to quote granted in the document)
 - Above document must now be purchased 

United States Generally Accepted Accounting Principles
Accounting in the United States
Government Accountability Office
Government audit
Government finances in the United States
Political corruption
Single Audit